Tbilissky (masculine), Tbilisskaya (feminine), or Tbilisskoye (neuter) may refer to:
Tbilissky District, a district of Krasnodar Krai, Russia
Tbilisskaya, a rural locality (a stanitsa) in Krasnodar Krai, Russia